Polycera maddoxi is a species of sea slug, a nudibranch, a shell-less marine gastropod mollusc in the family Polyceridae.

Distribution 
This species was described from two specimens collected in 1997 on a jetty piling at Port Taranaki, New Zealand. A specimen was photographed in 1988 at Hapuka Rock, Sugar Loaf Islands by David Maddox, who also collected the type specimen. It has also been reported from the Poor Knights Islands.

References

Polyceridae
Gastropods described in 2005